John Fullerton, Lord Fullerton,  (16 December 1775 – 3 December 1853) was a Scottish law lord.

Early life

He was born in Edinburgh on 16 December 1775 one of twelve children and second son to William Fullerton Esq of Carstairs and his wife Isabella. He was raised in a large house on Nicolson Street in Edinburgh's Southside. His elder sister Elizabeth married William Fullerton Elphinstone a Director of the East India Company.

He attended the High School in Edinburgh and then studied law at Edinburgh University, qualifying as an advocate on 17 February 1798.
In 1816 he was elected a Fellow of the Royal Society of Edinburgh. His proposers were John Playfair, Thomas Thomson, Sir David Brewster and John Gordon.

He became a Senator of the College of Justice (law lord) on 17 February 1829, and adopted the title Lord Fullerton, succeeding John Clerk, Lord Eldin. He then lived at 27 Melville Street in a newly built townhouse in Edinburgh's fashionable west end.

In the Disruption of 1843 Fullerton spoke largely in the defence of the established Church of Scotland within the lengthy legal debates. His arguments failed, therefore permitting the split.

He died at home 33 Moray Place on the Moray Estate in Edinburgh on 3 December 1853 in Edinburgh. His biography was written by Lord Strathclyde.

Family
In 1817 he married Georgina Hay Macdowall. They had eight children. Their children were Isabella Graeme Fullerton, William Fullerton, James Fullerton, Mary Fullerton, Elizabeth Elphinstone Fullerton, George Ferguson Fullerton, Georgina Fullerton and Henry Monteith Fullerton.

References

1775 births
1853 deaths
Fellows of the Royal Society of Edinburgh
Lawyers from Edinburgh
19th-century Scottish judges